Russel Elvin (born 27 December 1965) is a Trinidadian cricketer. He played in nine first-class and nine List A matches for Trinidad and Tobago from 1991 to 1994.

See also
 List of Trinidadian representative cricketers

References

External links
 

1965 births
Living people
Trinidad and Tobago cricketers